Rezzano-Nicosia is a village in Tuscany, central Italy, administratively a frazione of the comune of Calci, province of Pisa.

The village is composed by the two hamlets of Nicosia and Rezzano. It is about 12 km from Pisa and 1 km from the municipal seat of La Pieve.

References

Bibliography 
 

Frazioni of the Province of Pisa